Büdingen (Oberhess) station is a station on the Gießen–Gelnhausen railway (also known as the Lahn-Kinzig Railway) in the town of Büdingen in the German state of Hesse. The station is located in the centre of the town. Büches-Düdelsheim station is also located in the municipality, in the district of Büches. The station is classified by Deutsche Bahn (DB) as a category 5 station.

History
The station was opened on 30 October 1870 as the end of the third section of the Lahn Gießen–Gelnhausen railway (Nidda–Büdingen) by the Upper Hessian Railway Company. Exactly a month later, the railway was extended to Gelnhausen.

The entrance hall of the station is now listed as a monument under the Hessian Heritage Act. The station building is now privately owned and is no longer used for rail purposes. The condition has deteriorated and dilapidated.

Operations
Büdingen is served by the RB (Regionalbahn) 36 service of the Hessische Landesbahn (Hessian State Railway, HLB) on the Gießen–Nidda–Glauburg-Stockheim–Gelnhausen route. The “house” platform (platform 1) is used by trains towards Gelnhausen. Track 2 is used by trains towards Nidda or Gießen. The service operates at 60-minute intervals in both directions, but is supplemented by an extra service towards Gelnhausen in the morning peak and after lunch and from Gelnhausen in the evening peak. Gießen can be reached in around 75 minutes by train, and Frankfurt (with a change in Gelnhausen to the RE 50 service) in about an hour.

The Lahn-Kinzig Railway also offers interchanges in Nidda (with SE/RB 32 towards Friedberg or Frankfurt) and in  Glauburg-Stockheim  (with RE/RB 34 towards Bad Vilbel or Frankfurt).

Buses
Büdingen station is connected by several bus routes to the surrounding area.

Notes

References
 

Railway stations in Hesse
Buildings and structures in Wetteraukreis
Railway stations in Germany opened in 1870